is a Japanese public official.

Suzuki graduated from Kyoto University and joined the Ministry of International Trade and Industry in 1973. He was appointed General Manager of the Washington office of Japan National Oil Corporation in May 1988, Deputy Director-General of the Agency for Natural Resources and Energy in July 2001, and Director of the Economic and Industrial Policy Bureau in July 2006. He was also Commissioner of the Japan Patent Office from July 2008, but has since stepped down.

References 

Japanese government officials
Kyoto University alumni
1949 births
Living people
Commissioners of the Japan Patent Office